Planpyrgiscus lawsi is a species of sea snail, a marine gastropod mollusk in the family Pyramidellidae, the pyrams and their allies.

Notes
Additional information regarding this species:
 Nomenclature: Turbonilla delli is the correct name for this species when Planpyrgiscus is treated as a synonym or subgenus of Turbonilla in which case Turbonilla lawsi (Dell, 1956) is preoccupied by T. lawsi Powell, 1937.

References

External links
 To World Register of Marine Species

Pyramidellidae
Gastropods described in 1956